Selimi may refer to:
Petrit Selimi (b. 1979), Kosovar activist
Sylejman Selimi, Kosovar general